Daniel Ricardo Díaz (born 7 July 1989) is an Argentine road bicycle racer, who currently rides for UCI Continental team .

Career

San Luis Somos Todos (2012–2014)
In 2012, he came in second place of the general classification of the Tour de San Luis. He was originally third, but Alberto Contador's results were later voided, which also awarded him the fifth stage of that race since he had finished second behind Contador.

In January 2013, Díaz won the overall classification of the Tour de San Luis, besting second-placed Tejay van Garderen by 33 seconds. He earned the leader's jersey after the mountainous stage 5, where he finished second behind his teammate Emmanuel Guevara. He managed to hold on to his lead until the end of the seven-stage race, scoring another second place on the sixth stage finishing atop the Mirador del Sol, 2 seconds behind Alberto Contador, who placed a strong attack in the closing kilometer.

Major results

2009
 Vuelta al Ecuador
1st Stages 6 & 7 
 10th Prova Ciclística 9 de Julho
2010
 3rd Overall Vuelta a Navarra
1st Stages 2 & 3
2011
 4th Paris–Troyes
 4th Paris–Mantes-en-Yvelines
2012
 2nd Overall Tour de San Luis
1st Stage 5
 9th Overall Vuelta a Bolivia
1st Stage 9a
2013
 1st  Overall Tour de San Luis
 9th Overall Vuelta a Bolivia
1st Stage 3 (TTT)
2014
 National Road Championships
1st  Road race
2nd Time trial
2015
 1st  Overall Tour de San Luis
1st Stages 2 & 4
2016
 10th Road race, Pan American Road Championships

References

External links

Daniel Diaz profile on Cycling Base

Argentine male cyclists
1989 births
Living people
Cyclists at the 2016 Summer Olympics
Olympic cyclists of Argentina
People from Salta
Sportspeople from Salta Province